Compagnetto da Prato was an Italian poet of the Sicilian school in the court of emperor Frederick II, maybe a jester. Two of his poems, L'amor fa una donna amare and Per lo marito c'ò rio, are known.

People from Prato
Italian poets
Italian male poets
Italian culture
13th-century Italian poets
Year of death unknown
Year of birth unknown
Sicilian School poets